AppBox is a multipurpose app for the iPhone and iPod Touch.  The application combines 28 single purpose applications into one.

It has a  password-protected wallet, tip calculator, dice for random choosing, date calculator, days until countdown, holidays, translator, unit converter, bubble level, ruler, mirror, currency converter, price comparison, sale price, period calculator for women, a link to Google docs, horoscope, rock paper scissors, and more.

References

External links
 Leon Ishimov (Developer) - instagram.com/ishimoff

2009 software
IOS software